Prince Agyemang (born 25 December 1994) is a Ghanaian footballer who plays for Latvian club Valmieras FK as a midfielder.

Club career
Born in Kumasi, Agyemang played for Red Bull Ghana and Right to Dream Academy before moving to League of Ireland Premier Division side Limerick on 8 March 2014. He made his debut for the club six days later, coming on as a late substitute in a 2–1 away loss against Dundalk.

Agyemang featured regularly for the side before returning to Right to Dream in 2015. Late in the year he re-joined Limerick, but appeared rarely.

Agyemang made his professional debut in the Ghana Premier League for New Edubiase United on 23 April 2016 in a game against Asante Kotoko. On 1 July, he moved to Portugal after agreeing to a contract with S.C. Covilhã in Segunda Liga.

On 23 August 2017, Agyemang signed for Spanish Segunda División B club Ontinyent CF.

References

External links
 
 
 

1994 births
Footballers from Kumasi
Living people
Ghanaian footballers
Association football midfielders
League of Ireland players
Ghana Premier League players
Liga Portugal 2 players
USL Championship players
Latvian Higher League players
Limerick F.C. players
New Edubiase United F.C. players
S.C. Covilhã players
Ontinyent CF players
Richmond Kickers players
FK Liepāja players
Valmieras FK players
Ghanaian expatriate footballers
Ghanaian expatriate sportspeople in Portugal
Ghanaian expatriate sportspeople in Spain
Ghanaian expatriate sportspeople in Latvia
Expatriate association footballers in the Republic of Ireland
Expatriate footballers in Portugal
Expatriate footballers in Spain
Expatriate footballers in Latvia